Kohel Bolagh (also Romanized as Kohel Bolāgh; also known as Kohel Bolāgh-e Sahand and Kohel Bolāghī) is a village in Almalu Rural District, Nazarkahrizi District, Hashtrud County, East Azerbaijan Province, Iran. At the 2006 census, its population was 24, in 7 families.

References 

Towns and villages in Hashtrud County